Anton Igorevich Kobyalko (born 14 May 1986) is a Russian professional footballer. He plays for Tyumen.

Club career
Kobyalko made his professional debut in the Russian First Division in 2004 for FC Metallurg-Kuzbass Novokuznetsk.

On 20 July 2020, Kobyalko left Ararat-Armenia. On 24 July, Kobyalko signed for FC Pyunik.

Career statistics

Club

Honours

Club
Ararat-Armenia
 Armenian Premier League (2): 2018–19, 2019–20
 Armenian Supercup (1): 2019

References

1986 births
Sportspeople from Barnaul
Living people
Russian footballers
Association football forwards
Russian Premier League players
Russian First League players
Russian Second League players
Armenian Premier League players
FC KAMAZ Naberezhnye Chelny players
FC Ural Yekaterinburg players
FC Orenburg players
FC SKA-Khabarovsk players
FC Novokuznetsk players
FC Baltika Kaliningrad players
FC Ararat-Armenia players
FC Dynamo Barnaul players
FC Tyumen players
Russian expatriate footballers
Expatriate footballers in Armenia